Miro Mihovilović (22 February 1915 – 12 February 2010) was a Croatian water polo player. He competed in the men's tournament at the 1936 Summer Olympics.

See also
 Yugoslavia men's Olympic water polo team records and statistics
 List of men's Olympic water polo tournament goalkeepers

References

External links
 

1915 births
2010 deaths
Water polo players from Split, Croatia
Croatian male water polo players
Water polo goalkeepers
Olympic water polo players of Yugoslavia
Water polo players at the 1936 Summer Olympics
Burials at Lovrinac Cemetery